Serhiy Palkin (born October 22, 1974) is a Ukrainian association football functionary, who works as General director of FC Shakhtar Donetsk.

Career

Serhiy Palkin is graduated from the National Academy of Management in Kyiv.

From 1997 to 2001 he worked as a Senior Accountant for Coopers & Lybrand JV (later, the company was renamed PricewaterhouseCoopers Ltd). In July 2001 Palkin was appointed Deputy CEO for Budgeting & Economics at Kryvyi Rih Cement & Mining Plant JSC, being promoted to the Economics & Finance Director post in 2002. After thet, on June 3, 2003 he joined Shakhtar CJSC in the CFO capacity, being appointed as the club CEO on 18 June 2004.

Palkin is the Companion of Order of Merit of grade III (awarded in 2009). He was also awarded the Order of Merit of grade II in 2011.

Sources 

 Official page on FC Shakhtar web cite

1974 births
FC Shakhtar Donetsk non-playing staff
Living people
People from Kryvyi Rih
Ukrainian football chairmen and investors
Recipients of the Order of Merit (Ukraine), 2nd class
Recipients of the Order of Merit (Ukraine), 3rd class